State Route 38 (SR 38) is a north–south highway located entirely in Hamilton County in southern East Tennessee. The  highway runs concurrently with U.S. Route 11 (US 11) for its entire length from the Georgia state line to the US 41/US 64/US 72 (SR 2) in west Chattanooga.

Major intersections

See also 
 
 
 U.S. Route 11 in Tennessee

References
Mileage retrieved from DeLorme Street Atlas USA
Official Tennessee Highway Maps

038
U.S. Route 11
038